Lois Hamilton (October 14, 1943 – December 23, 1999) was an American model, author, aviator, artist and actress.

Life and career
Lois Hamilton was born Lois Irene Yanessa on October 14, 1943, in Philadelphia, Pennsylvania. She studied at Temple University in her native Philadelphia before attending the University of Florence in Florence, Italy, where she received degrees in psychology and fine arts.

Her looks brought an opportunity with the Ford Modeling Agency where she became one of its top models during the 1970s. Hamilton graced the covers of many magazines, including Cosmopolitan, Fortune, Mademoiselle, Vogue Italia, Prevue, Neue Revue Illustrierte, Newsweek, Paris Match, Hello!, Redbook, Ladies' Home Journal, Glamour, Time, and many others. Some of her ad campaigns included Chanel, Clairol, Halston, Pucci, and Hermès; in all, she appeared in over 150 commercials worldwide during her career.

She moved to Hollywood, where she made a successful transition from model to actress. Within a year, she landed more TV stints than any other actress at her agency. She worked with such notables as Ivan Reitman, Neil Simon, Sydney Pollack, Robert Redford, Ned Beatty, Burt Reynolds, John Candy, John Larroquette, Dom DeLuise, Roger Moore, Bill Murray, Jane Fonda, Dean Martin, Carl Reiner, David Carradine, Sammy Davis, Jr., Steve Guttenberg, Howard W. Koch, Albert S. Ruddy, Hal Needham, and Thomas R. Bond II to name a few. Under the name Lois Hamilton or Lois Areno, she appeared in Stripes and several Hollywood films as well as on television shows including many popular series such as Card Sharks, The Dukes of Hazzard and Three's Company.

When she was not involved in a feature film or television project, she took to the skies, where she was a licensed private pilot. She logged over 600 hours in the air and was an accomplished aerobatic pilot, flying her 1936 German biplane. Hamilton was also an accomplished sculptress, painter and writer. She exhibited her bronze sculptures and oil paintings in many one-woman shows in Los Angeles.

Death
On December 23, 1999, Hamilton locked herself in her hotel room at the Sheraton Hotel in Rio de Janeiro, Brazil, where she consumed a fatal overdose of sleeping pills. She was 56 years old. She was interred in Valhalla Memorial Park Cemetery in North Hollywood, California.

Filmography

References

External links

 
 

1943 births
1999 suicides
American women aviators
Female models from Philadelphia
American film actresses
American television actresses
Burials at Valhalla Memorial Park Cemetery
Drug-related suicides in Brazil
Actresses from Philadelphia
Temple University alumni
University of Florence alumni
20th-century American actresses
Female suicides
1999 deaths